The Reivers (also known as The Yellow Winton Flyer in the UK) is a 1969 Technicolor film in Panavision starring Steve McQueen and directed by Mark Rydell based on the 1962 William Faulkner novel The Reivers, a Reminiscence. The supporting cast includes Sharon Farrell, Rupert Crosse, Mitch Vogel, and Burgess Meredith as the narrator.

Plot
Set in 1905, the film follows the exploits of the likable but raffish Boon Hoggenbeck (Steve McQueen), who takes an interest in a new car, a new 1905 Winton Flyer that is the property of a man named Boss (Will Geer), the patriarch of the McCaslin family, who live in the Mississippi area where Boon lives. When the taking of the car first by Boon and then by Ned (Rupert Crosse) (they show themselves to be reivers, or thieves, in the film's start, hence the title) leads to a public brawl, the local magistrate lets them off by a bond that Boss pays on the condition both men stay out of trouble and far away from the car while he is away with family to attend a funeral. That is soon changed by Boon, who takes the car again to go up to Memphis to see his love interest Corrie (Sharon Farrell) and talks his young friend Lucius (Mitch Vogel) into going for the ride. Ned stows away as well, but Boon grudgingly allows him to come. Other characters include a horse that loves sardines and races for them, a friendly bordello madam and her amiable employees, and a man with a horse who lives near an impassable sinkhole full of mud for which he charges expensive rates to get both carts and cars through.

Cast

 Steve McQueen as Boon Hogganbeck
 Sharon Farrell as Corrie
 Mitch Vogel as Lucius McCaslin
 Rupert Crosse as Ned McCaslin
 Ruth White as Miss Reba
 Michael Constantine as Mr. Binford
 Clifton James as Butch Lovemaiden
 Juano Hernandez as Uncle Possum
 Lonny Chapman as Maury McCaslin (Lucius' father)
 Will Geer as Boss McCaslin (Lucius' grandfather)
 Allyn Ann McLerie as Alison McCaslin (Lucius' mother)
 Lindy Davis as Otis
 Diane Shalet as Hannah
 Pat Randall as May Ellen
 Diane Ladd as Phoebe
 Ellen Geer as Sally
 Dub Taylor as Dr. Peabody
 Burgess Meredith as the narrator (voice)

Awards 
1970 Oscar Nominations:
 Actor in a Supporting Role – Rupert Crosse ("Ned McCaslin") making him the first African American to receive a nomination in this category.
 Music (Original Score – for a motion picture [not a musical]) – John Williams

Home media
The Reivers was released to DVD by Paramount Home Video on June 14, 2005 as a Region 1 widescreen DVD.

The film was later released on Blu-Ray by Kino Lorber.

See also
 List of American films of 1969

References

External links 
 
 
 
 
 

1969 films
1960s coming-of-age comedy-drama films
American coming-of-age comedy-drama films
Cinema Center Films films
Films about automobiles
Films based on American novels
Films based on works by William Faulkner
Films directed by Mark Rydell
Films set in 1905
Films set in Mississippi
Films shot in Mississippi
Films scored by John Williams
American horse racing films
American road comedy-drama films
1969 comedy films
1969 drama films
1960s English-language films
1960s American films